Tsughrughasheni is a Georgian Orthodox church in the Bolnisi District, Georgia. It is situated approximately 2 kilometres from Bolnisi Sioni basilica, on the right bank of the Bolnisistsqali River. The church was built in 1212–1222 supposedly by King George IV Lasha of the Bagrationi Dynasty.

The Tsughrughasheni church resembles stylistically the other Georgian churches from the 12th–13th centuries – Betania, Kvatakhevi, Pitareti – but it is smaller than those and has a higher cupola. The plan of the church is right-angled. The church is rich with the Georgian traditional ornaments adorned.

Gallery

Bibliography 
 Georgian Soviet Encyclopedia, P. Zakaraia, XI, p. 351, Tbilisi, 1987

Churches in Georgia (country)
Churches completed in 1222
13th-century Eastern Orthodox church buildings
Buildings and structures in Kvemo Kartli
Bolnisi
13th-century churches in Georgia (country)